Roger Hampson (born 15 November 1948) is a former Australian rules footballer who played with Essendon in the Victorian Football League (VFL). Hampson played eight games in his first season with Essendon and won the club's best first-year player award, but a severe knee injury forced him to miss the latter half of the year and all of 1970. He returned in 1971, but could only manage two more senior games before leaving mid-season to Victorian Football Association side Northcote. Hampson next played with fellow VFA team Sandringham for a year before moving to suburban football. He was captain-coach of East Caulfield, Balwyn and Edithvale-Aspendale before a stint as assistant coach to VFL club Melbourne's under-19s. Hampson came back to Essendon 1989 to be the club's general manager for seven years.

He now works for Penleigh and Essendon Grammar School as a Religion and English teacher.

Notes

External links 		
		

Essendon Football Club player profile	
		
		
		

Living people
1948 births
Australian rules footballers from Victoria (Australia)		
Essendon Football Club players
La Trobe University alumni
Northcote Football Club players
Sandringham Football Club players
Australian schoolteachers